Shrimp and grits is a traditional dish in the Lowcountry of the coastal Carolinas and Georgia in the United States. It is a traditional breakfast dish, though many consider it more of a lunch or supper dish. Elsewhere, grits are accompanied by fried catfish or salmon croquettes.

Gallery

See also

 List of seafood dishes

References

Soul food
Shrimp dishes
Lowcountry cuisine